The Opel Rekord Series A is an executive car introduced in March 1963, by Opel as a replacement for the Opel Rekord P2. It was fractionally shorter but also wider than its predecessor with a wheelbase approximately 10 cm longer.

The Rekord (Series A) combined a stylish modern body with a range of engines little changed since 1937. In August 1965 it was replaced by the Opel Rekord (Series B) which from the outside was surprisingly similar, but which under the bonnet/hood would introduce a new generation of four-cylinder engines that would power Rekords until 1986, when Rüsselsheim produced its last Opel Rekord.

The car
The Rekord A that appeared in March 1963 was a robust response to the success of the Ford Taunus 17M. The design of the new Rekord sedan came not from Germany but from the General Motors Technical Center in Warren, Michigan, and was inspired by the successful Chevrolet II. It was styled to look slimmer and more sporty than its predecessor, but underneath its reassuringly clean design the Rekord A remained faithful to the trusted technical layout of previous models, from which the 1488cc and 1680cc four-cylinder overhead valve engines were taken, albeit now with an enlarged carburetter and claimed maximum power which even on the entry level cars, came in at 55 hp (40 kW).

The name
The original sales material named the car the Opel Rekord P3, which would have been a logical continuation from the previous model, known as the Opel Rekord P2. The decision to stress the newness of the design by calling it the Opel Rekord A was evidently taken very late in the day.

Until 1959 previous versions had been badged as Opel Olympia Rekords, and while the Olympia name had now disappeared from the car's official name, the word "Olympia" was still inscribed across the glove box lid in chrome script. The 1937 Opel Olympia had redefined the Opel range, being one of the first monocoque designs in Europe, and the company had tooled up to produce it in huge numbers. Evidently Opel were keen to keep alive the memory of the first Olympia.

Body configurations
The relatively extensive range of body types followed the pattern of the predecessor model. The top seller was the saloon/sedan, available with either 2 or 4 doors. There was a "CarAVan" station wagon, but still only with three doors which was normal in Germany, although by now station wagons of this size produced in France, Italy, England or Sweden almost invariably came with a second set of doors for the passengers in the back. Opel also offered a three-door delivery van which was essentially identical to the station wagon except that the rear side windows and C-pillar were covered with a metal panel.

A coupé version was also assembled on the Rüsselsheim production line along with the Sedan and the CarAVan. The design, which heavily penalised rear seat head-room in order to provide a more stylish profile, was the work of Opel's German development team, working with the already finalised North American design of the sedan.

Cabriolet versions were also available. Based on the Rekord A coupé, these were conversions from the body builders Autenreith until they ceased production in 1964, and thereafter by Karl Deutsch. This approach made them much more expensive than the other cars in the range, and the cabriolet conversion was not offered with the smaller 1,488 cc engine. Very few Rekord A cabriolets were sold.

Engines

Four cylinders
Unlike the modern bodywork, the 1,488 cc OHV four-cylinder water-cooled engine was very little changed since it had first been offered in the Opel Olympia back in 1937. Available minimum fuel octanes had been progressively increased since 1945, however, and even the entry level, now with a compression ratio of 7.25:1, now came with a claimed maximum power of 55 hp (40 kW) at 4,500 rpm. A 36 mm diameter carbureter, previously included on the larger four-cylinder engine, was now included across the range. In addition the 1680 cc four-cylinder version of the engine, first offered in the 1959 Rekord P1 was offered as an option now with 60 hp (44 kW) or, in return for a raised 8.0:1 compression ratio, 67 hp (49 kW) on the 1700S version of the engine.  Torque was correspondingly increased on the more powerful engines. All the four-cylinder engines retained their side camshafts driving the cylinder valves by a combination of rods and rocker arms. By now the side camshaft four-cylinder engine was viewed as old fashioned, but over the years it had acquired a reputation for reliability.

Six cylinders
In March 1964 the Rekord A became the first Opel Rekord to be available with a six-cylinder engine. The engine in question was the 2,605 cc unit, shared with the newly introduced 1964 Opels Admiral and Kapitän. On all three applications maximum power output of 100 hp (74 kW) was claimed at this stage.

The new six-cylinder powered Opel Rekord L-6 had an advertised top speed between 163 and 168 km/h (101 - 104 mph) making it the first Rekord able to offer a top speed above 100 mph in non-metric markets (chiefly, in this case, the UK and the US). But the car was not an unqualified delight. Fuel efficiency slumped, the car needing 12 litres of "super grade" high octane fuel to cover 100 km. The six-cylinder engine was also heavy: there was no mention of any power-assisted brakes or power-assisted steering option on the Rekord A, the latter feature being reserved for luxury cars such as the Opel Admiral and Kapitän. Neither feature would have been expected at the Rekord's price level in Europe in the 1960s, but it was nonetheless noted that the Rekord L-6 was heavy to drive in slow urban traffic.

The six-cylinder Rekord L-6, along with the Admiral and Kapitän are also noteworthy as the first Opels to come with 12-volt electrical systems. Hitherto Opel customers, like Volkswagen customers and (until 1967) German Ford customers all had to make do with 6-volt electrics.

Brakes

The four-cylinder Rekord A, like its predecessor, came with hydraulically controlled drum brakes all-round. 230 mm drums replaced the standard 200 mm diameter drums for the rear wheels of the CarAVan and panel van vehicles.

The six-cylinder Rekord, with its extra weight, came with front disc brakes included in the price, and the larger 230 mm diameter drums from the estate cars at the back.

Transmission and running gear
The Rekord A took its three-speed all-synchromesh transmission from its predecessor, but this was now offered only with the 1,488 cc engine. A four-speed all-synchromesh unit was available as an extra on 1,488 cc cars and included in the price where a larger engine was specified. Although most cars continued to be delivered with a column mounted gear change, a floor mounted gear lever positioned between the front seats was also available. The option of an "Olymat" automatic clutch provided by Fichel & Sachs was offered. The system was broadly similar to the Fichel & Sachs "Saxomat" automatic clutch offered at this time by other German automakers. The 2,605 cc engine on the Kapitän and Admiral came with a new automatic gear-box, but no fully automatic transmission was offered with this engine when fitted in the Rekord.

Other principal mechanical elements on the Rekord A such as the suspension and steering systems were also lifted largely unchanged from the Rekord P2, and conformed to the norms of the time.

Commercial
At launch the entry level the 1,488 cc two-door Record came with a domestic market manufacturer's recommended price of DM 6,830. At the other end of the range a factory built Rekord coupé L-6, powered by the six-cylinder 2,605 cc engine borrowed from the Kapitän, could be purchased for DM 9,310. Customers wishing to pay for a coach-builder cabriolet conversion would need to find DM 11,765 for a car with the 1700S (1,680 cc, 89 hp) four-cylinder engine or (from 1964) DM 13,060 for a six-cylinder Rekord cabriolet.

The Rekord A was produced at an annual rate slightly ahead of its predecessor. It was a commercial success. It was formally replaced in August 1965 after a 29-month production run during which 887,488 cars had been produced. As before, the nearest competitor in terms of price, size, power and target market came from Ford. The new Ford Taunus 17M was introduced in 1964 and during a three-year production run it would chalk up 710,059 units. The Opel Rekord would never challenge the smaller cheaper Volkswagen Beetle for top slot in the West German sales charts, but the success of the Rekord A and its successors ensured that the Rekord's market dominance within its own class was never again threatened by Ford Germany or anyone else.

Technical data

See also
 Opel Rekord
 Opel Commodore

References
Werner Oswald: Deutsche Autos 1945–1975. Motorbuch Verlag, Stuttgart 1975, S. 88–93

External links 

 Opel Rekord A bei opel-specials.de
 Opel Rekord A bei kfz-tech.de

Rekord A
Sedans
Station wagons
Executive cars
Rear-wheel-drive vehicles
Cars introduced in 1963
1960s cars